Paul-Philipp Kaufmann  is a German field hockey player who plays as a midfielder for Dutch Hoofdklasse club Den Bosch and the German national team.

Club career
Kaufmann played for TSV Mannheim before he joined Den Bosch in the Netherlands for the 2021–22 season.

References

External links

1996 births
Living people
German male field hockey players
Field hockey players at the 2020 Summer Olympics
Olympic field hockey players of Germany
Male field hockey midfielders
Sportspeople from Mannheim
Men's Feldhockey Bundesliga players
HC Den Bosch players
Men's Hoofdklasse Hockey players
21st-century German people